This is a list of Nigerian films released in 2000.

Films

See also 

 List of Nigerian films

References 

2000
Nigeria
Films
2000s in Nigerian cinema